Hard Rock Lake Tahoe (formerly Sahara Tahoe, High Sierra, Horizon Lake Tahoe and Park Tahoe) is a hotel and casino located in Stateline, Nevada. Also previously known as Sahara Tahoe and High Sierra resorts, it is one of four major casino hotels in Stateline. Horizon Lake Tahoe closed on April 1, 2014, to begin a $60 million renovation and rebranding as Hard Rock Lake Tahoe, which held its grand opening on January 28, 2015.

History

Sahara Tahoe (1965–1983)

The property opened as Sahara Tahoe in 1965. Elvis Presley performed here from 1971 to 1976 and his suite is still available for guests to book.

High Sierra (1983–1990)
In 1983, the hotel was given a Western theme and re-branded High Sierra Hotel and in 1985 hosted the companies who defined the High Sierra Format, the basis for how computers access CD-ROMs today.

Horizon Lake Tahoe (1990–2014)

In 1990, it was sold to Columbia Sussex, which re-branded the hotel again as Horizon. Columbia Sussex (leaseholder) was in a contract dispute with Park Cattle Company (now Edgewood Companies), the landowners of Horizon and MontBleu (formerly known as Caesars Tahoe), which Columbia Sussex acquired from Harrah's Entertainment (later Caesars Entertainment Corporation) in 2005.

On May 5, 2009 Tropicana Entertainment announced that it had assigned the lease, operation and management of Horizon to Lake Tahoe Realty I, LLC. an affiliate of Columbia Sussex, under the terms for the assignment of the Horizon lease stipulate continuous operation of nonrestricted gaming at Horizon.

In March 2014, it was announced that the Lake Tahoe Realty's lease to operate the hotel/casino had expired on March 31, 2014 and was not renewed. The Park Companies took over the property under an LLC known as "NevaOne" and closed the property on April 1, 2014 to begin an intense $40 million top-to-bottom makeover. NevaOne has contracted with Las Vegas-based Warner Hospitality to operate the hotel and casino. They operate Hard Rock Las Vegas and have built and run hotel/casinos across the country.

Hard Rock (2014–present)

In July 2014, the Park family announced that the former Horizon will be rebranded as Hard Rock, to open on January 28, 2015, after extensive renovations.

Paragon Gaming acquired a majority stake in the property in 2016.

See also

References

External links
 

1965 establishments in Nevada
Casino hotels
Casinos completed in 1965
Casinos in Stateline, Nevada
Hard Rock Cafe
Hotel buildings completed in 1965
Hotels established in 1965
Hotels in Stateline, Nevada
Resorts in Nevada